"Martin Eden" is a song by French hip hop artist Nekfeu, produced by himself and DJ Elite. The first track from Nekfeu's debut studio album Feu, the song entered the French Singles Chart at number 129 on 20 June 2015, where it has since peaked, despite not being officially released as a single.

Track listing
 Digital download
 "Martin Eden" – 4:55

Chart performance

References

2015 songs
Nekfeu songs
French hip hop songs
Songs written by Nekfeu